Quest for the Sea was a Canadian documentary television series. It is a four episode 1-hour living history documentary series that followed two families as they returned to a lost way of life in a remote fishing village in Hay Cove, Newfoundland. In simple wooden homes with only the tools, clothing, and supplies of 1937, five adults and five children lived under a mercantile system and needed to rely on cod fishing for their sustenance and survival. Quest for the Sea was the fourth of the "Quest" series from producer Jamie Brown which also included Pioneer Quest: A Year in the Real West (2001), Quest for the Bay (2002), and Klondike: The Quest for Gold (2003).

Cast 

 Mary Ann Graham
 Harold St.Croix
 Anna Wheeler
 Elliot Wheeler
 Ralph Wheeler
 Allison Murray
 Anny Murray
 Mack Murray
 Mitchell Murray
 Monte Murray

Episodes

References

External links 
 

2000s Canadian documentary television series
Historical reality television series
2004 Canadian television series debuts
2004 Canadian television series endings
History (Canadian TV network) original programming